Take 'em and Shake 'em is a 1931 American Pre-Code comedy film directed by Fatty Arbuckle and starring June MacCloy.

Cast
 June MacCloy
 Marion Shilling
 Gertrude Short
 Charles Judels
 Arthur Hoyt

See also
 Fatty Arbuckle filmography

External links

1931 films
1931 comedy films
1931 short films
RKO Pictures short films
American black-and-white films
Films directed by Roscoe Arbuckle
American comedy short films
1930s English-language films
1930s American films